, known as Victory Boxing 2 in Europe and Contender in North America, is a sports video game developed by Victor Interactive Software exclusively for PlayStation in 1998.

Reception

The game received mixed reviews according to the review aggregation website GameRankings. Next Generation said, "From the uninspired graphics to the sloppy and ill-thought-out gameplay, there is nothing in Contender that stands out as being particularly good and quite a bit that is actually painful to experience. Sony should be ashamed of inflicting this abomination on the gaming public." In Japan, Famitsu gave it a score of 21 out of 40.

Notes

References

External links

1998 video games
Boxing video games
PlayStation (console) games
PlayStation (console)-only games
Single-player video games
Sony Interactive Entertainment games
Victor Interactive Software games
Video games developed in Japan